Edward Wayne Sheley (May 5, 1916 – August 9, 1989) was a Canadian football player who played for the Winnipeg Blue Bombers. He won the Grey Cup with them in 1939 and 1941. He attended Augustana College in South Dakota, and was inducted into their athletics hall of fame in 1970.

References

1916 births
1989 deaths
People from Clay County, Iowa
American football quarterbacks
Canadian football quarterbacks
American players of Canadian football
Augustana (South Dakota) Vikings football players
Winnipeg Blue Bombers players
Players of American football from Iowa